Canadian Idol is a Canadian reality television competition show which aired on CTV, based on the British show Pop Idol. The show was a competition to find the most talented young singer in Canada, and was hosted by Ben Mulroney. Jon Dore was the "roving reporter" for the first three seasons (appearing in comedy skits throughout the show). Elena Juatco (a season 2 contestant) assumed the role for season four, Dave Kerr had the role in season five and Jully Black in season six.

The show began with a cross-Canada tour in which singers audition in front of four judges: Jake Gold of Toronto, Sass Jordan of Montreal, Quebec, Zack Werner of Winnipeg, Manitoba, and Farley Flex of Ajax, Ontario. Eventually the performers were narrowed down to 10 finalists (11 in season one due to a near-tie), with each competitor performing live. Viewers had two hours following the broadcast of the show to phone in their votes for their favourite competitor. On the following night's episode (live again), the competitor with the fewest votes was sent home. After the final two perform, viewers had more than two hours to vote. The next day (five days later in season 4; two days later in season 6), the competitor with the most votes was declared the winner. The show was taped at the John Bassett Theatre in Toronto, Ontario.

In December 2008, CTV announced that Canadian Idol would be "suspended", not airing in the 2009 season due to "the current economic climate". At that time, the network stated that it expected the show would return in 2010. However, CTV has not made any further announcement regarding the series since that time, and the series is now generally considered to have been cancelled. Following the announcement of the show's suspension, Joel Rubinoff, television critic for the Waterloo Region Record, strongly criticized the show's direction, declaring that it had "bottomed out creatively in every possible way" and "outlived its usefulness".

Final results 

In its six seasons, the winners and runners-up were:

Season 1

In the first season, which debuted on June 9, 2003, Ryan Malcolm of Kingston, Ontario won, with Gary Beals of Dartmouth, Nova Scotia coming in second. Malcolm released his debut album entitled "Home" in October 2003, which included his first single from Canadian Idol: "Something More". In fact, eight members of the Season One Top 11 have now released their own solo albums, including Gary Beals, Billy Klippert, Audrey De Montigny, Jenny Gear, Toya Alexis, Mikey Bustos, and Karen Lee Batten.

Auditions were held in Toronto, Montreal, Vancouver, Ottawa, Calgary, Winnipeg, Halifax, and St. John's.

Season 2

The second season of Canadian Idol debuted on June 1, 2004, and became the most-watched show in Canada, drawing in over 3 million viewers each week.

Auditions were held in Toronto, Montreal, Vancouver, Ottawa, Edmonton, Winnipeg, Halifax, Regina, and St. John's. The season provided an Idol franchise first when the final six contestants played their own instruments during a group performance of the Gordon Lightfoot classic "Canadian Railroad Trilogy".

Kalan Porter of Medicine Hat, Alberta won the series, and Theresa Sokyrka of Saskatoon, Saskatchewan was the runner-up. In November 2004, merely two months after the competition, Porter released his debut album entitled 219 Days – the number of days spanning from his first audition to the release of his CD. It was certified double platinum within two months and he received three Juno nominations. Porter also won Fan Favourite Canadian Artist at the MuchMusic Video Awards. Other competitors from Season Two's Top 10 who have released albums include: Sokyrka, Jacob Hoggard (four albums with his band Hedley), Jason Greeley, Shane Wiebe, and Joshua Seller. Porter is the first CI winner to have a second CD released by Sony BMG (Wake Up Living launched August 28, 2007). Jacob Hoggard released his second album (Universal) with his band, Hedley; the album's first single, "She's So Sorry", was released to radio August 20, 2007.

Season 3

In December 2004, CTV announced that they would be producing a third season of Canadian Idol in 2005. Auditions began in February and finished in April 2005 and the show debuted May 30, just days after the conclusion of the fourth season of American Idol but did not follow suit yet on the new change to that show.

Auditions were held in Toronto, Montreal, Vancouver, Ottawa, Calgary, Winnipeg, London, Sudbury, Saskatoon, St. John's, Moncton, Charlottetown, Sydney, and Whitehorse.

This season introduced a twist in the Wildcard semi-final round. On the group 4 results show, after the results were revealed, 11 previous competitors were brought out. (CTV had advertised the broadcast as having 12 competitors, but one dropped out at the last minute.) The judges expressed how they felt about each competitor, and each competitor had a chance to show why they should sing in the Wildcard, whether it be through song or a plea. Then, the public had a chance to vote which would decide which of the 11 competitors would sing in the Wildcard.

After the final, Melissa O'Neil of Calgary, Alberta was crowned the winner; with Rex Goudie of Burlington, Newfoundland and Labrador the runner-up. Melissa O'Neil, Rex Goudie, Aaron Walpole, and Suzi Rawn have released albums; while Casey LeBlanc, Ashley Leitao and Amber Fleury have released an album as a group called Braided. Josh Palmer is also working on an album release.

Season 4

In January 2006, CTV announced their plans for a fourth season of Canadian Idol. An 11-week audition tour took place in February, March and April 2006. Auditions were held in Toronto, Montreal, Vancouver, Ottawa, Edmonton, Winnipeg, Kitchener-Waterloo, Halifax, Regina, St. John's, and Yellowknife. Season two competitor Elena Juatco joined the show as the roving reporter, while Jon Dore did not return for the fourth season. The season premiered on May 29, five days after the finale of American Idol Season 5. The season finale of Canadian Idol took place on Sunday, September 17, 2006. The finale, originally scheduled for Tuesday, September 12, was moved to help resolve a conflict with ABC's 'Dancing with the Stars', which CTV also carried and which ABC announced would debut September 12. Eva Avila took the title in the closest final vote to date; CTV announced that 3.3% -- which amounted to 131,000 votes—separated her from Newfoundland's Craig Sharpe.

On Saturday, September 16, 2006, a day prior to the public announcement of the Idol results, Sony BMG Music Entertainment began offering Avila's version of the first single, Meant to Fly, for sale on the website EvaAvila.com. Although the page was subsequently blanked, the artwork for the single can currently be located within the image files of the webpage. This occurrence led to the creation of many rumours regarding the winner of the competition. Both Avila's and Sharpe's singles were made available for pre-order for the September 26, 2006 release date on Amazon.com.

As of 2009, Eva Avila ('Somewhere Else' and 'Give Me the Music'), Craig Sharpe ('I Am'), Chad Doucette ('Hit It'), Tyler Lewis ('I'm Coming Home'), and Brandon Jones ('All for You') had all launched debut CDs.

Season 5

In December 2006, CTV announced the plans for the fifth season of Canadian Idol. The audition tour began in Vancouver on February 3, and visited nine more cities across Canada in a 10-week trip. This year, the network announced that the auditioners can play along with their instrument in their audition. The network also indicated that Dave Kerr will replace Elena Juatco in the co-hosting role for Season Five. Season Five  premiered on June 5, 2007. On July 11, 2007 Canadian Idol voters picked their top ten. On September 4, 2007 these were narrowed down to the final two, Jaydee Bixby and Brian Melo.  On September 11, 2007, Brian Melo was voted the winner. Placing 3rd place was Carly Rae Jepsen, globally the best selling Canadian Idol alum to-date.

Season 6

In January 2008, CTV announced the plans for the sixth season of Canadian Idol.
The sixth season held auditions in Edmonton, Calgary, Vancouver, Winnipeg, Hamilton, Ottawa, Montreal, Halifax, St. John's, and Toronto.
In addition to the auditions, contestants who failed to advance to the next round or were unable to make it to an audition on the scheduled date were able to audition via cyberspace by uploading their 2-minute audition to the show's website. This was the first season to feature a top 24 instead of top 22 along with an uneven number of men and women in the cast.
The Canadian voters selected their Top 10 on July 9, 2008, and chose Theo Tams as the winner in the finale, which aired September 10.

Top selling Canadian Idol alumni

See also

Music of Canada

References

External links
 

 
2000s Canadian reality television series
2003 Canadian television series debuts
2000s Canadian music television series
2008 Canadian television series endings
Television series by Fremantle (company)
Canadian television series based on British television series
Television series by Insight Productions